Sehhatabad (also Romanized as Şeḩḩatābād and Şoḩbatābād) is a village in Sehhatabad Rural District in the Central District of Eshtehard County, Alborz province, Iran. At the 2006 census, its population was 719 in 183 households. The latest census in 2016 counted 993 people in 289 households.

References 

Eshtehard County

Populated places in Alborz Province

Populated places in Eshtehard County